"" ("The Night") is an art song composed by Richard Strauss  in 1885, setting a poem by the Austrian poet Hermann von Gilm. It was included in the first collection of songs Strauss ever published, as Op. 10 in 1885 (which included also "Zueignung"). The song is written for voice and piano.

Composition history 
In 1882, his friend Ludwig Thuile introduced Strauss to the poetry of Gilm contained in the volume  (last leaves), published in the year of the poet's death (and the composer's birth) 1864, which contained the poem Die Nacht. The Opus 10 songs were all intended for the tenor voice. Alan Jefferson wrote:

Die Nacht is a song of trembling and yearning, a song tinged with fear that the night, which takes away the familiar shapes of daylight, will also steal the beloved...Strauss manages to convey the manner in which the all-embracing power of night is stealing so mercilessly over everything: first by the a powerful (though gentle) rhythmic beat; and then by the minor seconds (two adjacent black and white notes put down together) which create the effect of merging two objects into one until they resolve into something else, musically as well as visually...Die Nacht is a supreme example of Strauss's art. 

Norman Del Mar notes that the opening musical phrase for the line "" is very similar to the "wonderful oboe solo from Don Juan, to be composed five years later".

Strauss recorded the song twice with himself at the piano: in 1919 with the Baritone Heinrich Schlusnus, and again for a 1942 wartime radio broadcast from Vienna with tenor Anton Dermota.

Lyrics

References
Notes

Sources

Norman Del Mar, Richard Strauss. A Critical Commentary on his Life and Works, Volume 3, London: Faber and Faber (2009)[1968] (second edition), .
Getz, Christine (1991), The Lieder of Richard Strauss, chapter 10 in Mark-Daniel Schmid, Richard Strauss Companion, Praeger Publishers, Westfield CT, 2003, .
Jefferson, Alan. (1971) The Lieder of Richard Strauss, Cassel and Company, London.  
Trenner, Franz (2003) Richard Strauss Chronik, Verlag Dr Richard Strauss Gmbh, Wien, .

Songs about nights
Songs by Richard Strauss
1885 songs